Wine Hill is an unincorporated community in Randolph County, Illinois, United States.

Wine Hill was so named in the 19th century from the vineyards started by German immigrants.

References

Unincorporated communities in Randolph County, Illinois
Unincorporated communities in Illinois